

Paul Reichelt (29 March 1898 – 15 July 1981) was a highly decorated Generalleutnant in the Wehrmacht during World War II and in the Bundeswehr. He was a recipient of the Knight's Cross of the Iron Cross of Nazi Germany.

Awards and decorations

 German Cross in Gold on 25 April 1942 as Oberstleutnant im Generalstab in General-Kommando IX. Armeekorps
 Knight's Cross of the Iron Cross on 8 October 1944 as Generalmajor and Chief of the general staff of Armee-Abteilung Narwa

References

Citations

Bibliography

 
 

1898 births
1981 deaths
People from Görlitz (district)
People from the Kingdom of Saxony
Lieutenant generals of the German Army (Wehrmacht)
Major generals of the German Army
Bundeswehr generals
German Army personnel of World War I
Reichswehr personnel
Recipients of the clasp to the Iron Cross, 2nd class
Recipients of the Gold German Cross
Recipients of the Knight's Cross of the Iron Cross
Military personnel from Saxony